Francis Bernard may refer to:

Francis Bernard (physician) (died 1698), English apothecary, physician and bibliophile
Francis Bernard (judge) (1663–1731), Solicitor-General for Ireland and Irish MP for Clonakilty, Bandonbridge 
Sir Francis Bernard, 1st Baronet (1712–1779), British Governor in New Jersey and Massachusetts
Francis Bernard, 1st Earl of Bandon (1755–1830), Irish peer and MP for Ennis, Bandonbridge
Francis Bernard, 3rd Earl of Bandon (1810–1877), Irish MP for Bandon, Lord Lieutenant of Cork
Francis Bernard (artist) (born 1928), French artist
Francis Bernard (American football) (born 1995), American football linebacker
Francis Bernard (engineer) (born 1940), founder and CEO of Dassault Systèmes
Francis James Bernard, founder and first police chief of the Singapore Police Force

See also
Sir Francis Bernard-Morland, 5th Baronet (1790–1876) of the Bernard baronets
Bernard (surname)